Xu Yanmei is a Chinese Paralympic powerlifter. She represented China at the 2012 Summer Paralympics held in London, United Kingdom and she won the bronze medal in the women's 82.5 kg event.

References

External links 
 

Living people
Chinese powerlifters
Paralympic powerlifters of China
Paralympic bronze medalists for China
Paralympic medalists in powerlifting
Powerlifters at the 2012 Summer Paralympics
Medalists at the 2012 Summer Paralympics
Year of birth missing (living people)
People from Shangrao
21st-century Chinese women